The North Report was a 2006 report evaluating reconstructions of the temperature record of the past two millennia, providing an overview of the state of the science and the implications for understanding of global warming. It was produced by a National Research Council committee, chaired by Gerald North, at the request of Representative Sherwood Boehlert as chairman of the U.S. House of Representatives Committee on Science.

These reconstructions had been dubbed "hockey stick graphs" after the 1999 reconstruction by Mann, Bradley and Hughes (MBH99), which used the methodology of their 1998 reconstruction covering 600 years (MBH98). A graph based on MBH99 was featured prominently in the 2001 IPCC Third Assessment Report (TAR), and became a focus of the global warming controversy over the 1997 Kyoto Protocol. It was disputed by various contrarians, and in the politicisation of this "hockey stick controversy" the New York Times of 14 February 2005 hailed a paper by businessman Stephen McIntyre and economist Ross McKitrick (MM05) as undermining the scientific consensus behind the Kyoto agreement. On 23 June 2005, Rep. Joe Barton, chairman of the House Committee on Energy and Commerce, with Ed Whitfield, Chairman of the Subcommittee on Oversight and Investigations,  wrote joint letters referring to issues raised by the Wall Street Journal article, and demanding that Mann, Bradley and Hughes provide full records on their data and methods, finances and careers, information about grants provided to the institutions they had worked for, and the exact computer codes used to generate their results. Boehlert said this was a "misguided and illegitimate investigation" into something that should properly be under the jurisdiction of the Science Committee, and in November 2005 after Barton dismissed the offer of an independent investigation organised by the U.S. National Academy of Sciences, Boehlert requested the review, which became the North Report.

The North Report went through a rigorous review process, and was published on 22 June 2006. It concluded "with a high level of confidence that global mean surface temperature was higher during the last few decades of the 20th century than during any comparable period during the preceding four centuries", justified by consistent evidence from a wide variety of geographically diverse proxies, but "Less confidence can be placed in large-scale surface temperature reconstructions for the period from 900 to 1600". It broadly agreed with the basic findings of the original MBH studies, which subsequently been supported by other reconstructions and proxy records, while emphasising uncertainties over earlier periods. The principal component analysis methodology that McIntyre and McKitrick had contested had a small tendency to bias results so was not recommended—but it had little influence on the final reconstructions, and other methods produced similar results.

Outline 
At the request of the U.S. Congress, initiated by Representative Sherwood Boehlert as chairman of the U.S. House of Representatives Committee on Science, a special "Committee on Surface Temperature Reconstructions for the Past 2,000 Years" was assembled by the National Research Council to quickly prepare a concise report. The NRC Committee, chaired by Gerald North, consisted of 12 scientists and statisticians from different disciplines. Its task was "to summarize current scientific information on the temperature record for the past two millennia, describe the main areas of uncertainty and how significant they are, describe the principal methodologies used and any problems with these approaches, and explain how central is the debate over the paleoclimate temperature record to the state of scientific knowledge on global climate change." The NRC report went through a rigorous review process involving 15 independent experts. The report provided a summary and an overview, followed by 11 technical chapters covering the instrumental and proxy records, statistical procedures, paleoclimate models, and the synthesis of large scale temperature reconstructions with an assessment of the "strengths, limitations, and prospects for improvement" in techniques used.

Publication and press conference
The NRC committee's report (the North report) was published on 22 June 2006. Committee member John Michael Wallace said that "Our conclusion is that this recent period of warming is likely the warmest in the last millennium", and added that "This doesn't change the scientific landscape in terms of the greenhouse warming debate". At a press conference, held on the same day, clarifications were given by three members of the NRC committee science panel: Gerald North, the statistician Peter Bloomfield and ice sheet/borehole specialist Kurt M. Cuffey.

NRC report summary
Its main findings were; 20th century instrumentally measured warming showed in observational evidence, and can be simulated with climate models, large-scale surface temperature reconstructions "yield a generally consistent picture of temperature trends during the preceding millennium", including the Medieval Warm Period and the Little Ice Age, "but the exact timing and duration of warm periods may have varied from region to region, and the magnitude and geographic extent of the warmth are uncertain." It concluded "with a high level of confidence that global mean surface temperature was higher during the last few decades of the 20th century than during any comparable period during the preceding four centuries", justified by consistent evidence from a wide variety of geographically diverse proxies, but "Less confidence can be placed in large-scale surface temperature reconstructions for the period from 900 to 1600", and very little confidence could be assigned to hemispheric or global mean surface temperature estimates before about 900.

The NRC committee stated that "The basic conclusion of Mann et al. (1998, 1999) was that the late 20th century warmth in the Northern Hemisphere was unprecedented during at least the last 1,000 years. This conclusion has subsequently been supported by an array of evidence that includes both additional large-scale surface temperature reconstructions and pronounced changes in a variety of local proxy indicators". It said "Based on the analyses presented in the original papers by Mann et al. and this newer supporting evidence, the committee finds it plausible that the Northern Hemisphere was warmer during the last few decades of the 20th century than during any comparable period over the preceding millennium", though there were substantial uncertainties before about 1600. It added that "Even less confidence can be placed in the original conclusions by Mann et al. (1999) that 'the 1990s are likely the warmest decade, and 1998 the warmest year, in at least a millennium' because the uncertainties inherent in temperature reconstructions for individual years and decades are larger than those for longer time periods and because not all of the available proxies record temperature information on such short timescales." It noted that "Surface temperature reconstructions for periods prior to the industrial era are only one of multiple lines of evidence supporting the conclusion that climatic warming is occurring in response to human activities, and they are not the primary evidence."

At the press conference, North said of the MBH papers that "we do roughly agree with the substance of their findings. There is a small disagreement over exactly how sure we are." All three from the NRC committee panel said it was probable, though not certain, that current warming exceeded any previous peak in the last thousand years. When asked if they could quantify "less confidence" and "plausible", Bloomfield explained that their wording reflected the panel's scientific judgements rather than well defined statistical procedures, and "When we speak of 'less confidence' we're more into a level of sort of 2 to 1 odds, which IPCC, they interpreted 'likely' as that level, roughly 2 to 1 odds or better."

MBH99 and controversy
The NRC report said that the MBH99 study had attracted considerable attention because of its conclusion that recent decades were the warmest in the northern hemisphere in 1000 years, and "Controversy arose because many people interpreted this result as definitive evidence of anthropogenic causes of recent climate change, while others criticized the methodologies and data that were used." Chapter 11 of the report described MBH98 as the "first systematic, statistically based synthesis of multiple climate proxies", and noted that the MBH reconstructions "were the first to include explicit statistical error bars". The report's overview section said that, despite the wide error bars, the hockey stick graph "was misinterpreted by some as indicating the existence of one 'definitive' reconstruction with small century-to-century variability prior to the mid-19th century".

When questioned about who had said MBH99 was definitive when the paper itself emphasised the uncertainties, North said his opinion was that, "The community probably took the results to be more definitive than Mann and colleagues originally intended." Kurt Cuffey said the context was that the MBH work "...was really the first of its kind," and had generated debate in the normal process of science where ideas are put forward then challenged over time. The IPCC 2001 report had been careful to give the two-year-old paper's conclusion fairly low confidence as "likely" at 2 to 1 odds, but use of the graph as a visual had created a misleading impression that this research was more resolved. The graph had been used as a visual in several places, including the IPCC summary for policymakers.

MBH statistical methods
Various criticisms of the MBH statistical methods were discussed in Chapter 11, in the context of more recent research that explored ways to address these problems, and showed greater amplitude of temperature variations over 1000 to 2000 years. Recent papers cited included . On McIntyre and McKitrick's criticism of principal component analysis as tending to bias the shape of the reconstructions, it found that "In practice, this method, though not recommended, does not appear to unduly influence reconstructions of hemispheric mean temperature", and reconstructions using other methods were qualitatively similar. Some of the criticisms of validation techniques were more valid than others, these issues and the effect on robustness of the choice of proxies contributed to the committee's view of increased uncertainties. They called for further research into methods and a search for more proxies for earlier periods.

At the press conference the three NRC panellists said they found no evidence supporting the allegations of inappropriate behaviour such as data manipulation, or "anything other than an honest attempt to construct a data analysis procedure". Bloomfield as a statistician considered all the choices of data processing and methods to have been "quite reasonable" in a "first of its kind study". He said "I would not have been embarrassed by that work at the time if I'd been involved in it". In response to a question from Edward Wegman on the MBH use of principal components analysis, Bloomfield said this had been reviewed by the committee along with other statistical issues, and "while the issues are real, they had a very minimal effect, not a material effect on the final reconstruction."

Responses
The U.S. House Science Committee Chairman Sherwood Boehlert issued a statement on the day of publication: "I think this report shows the value of Congress handling scientific disputes by asking scientists to give us guidance. The report clearly lays out a scientific consensus position on the historic temperature record." He noted that the report raised no doubts about global climate change or the legitimacy of any paper, and concluded that "The report does show, unsurprisingly, that scientists need to continue to work to develop a more precise sense of what global temperatures were between the beginning of the last millennium and about 1600. Congress ought to let them go about that work without political interference." In an opposing statement Senator Jim Inhofe said that "Today's NAS report reaffirms what I have been saying all along, that Mann's ‘hockey stick' is broken. Today's report refutes Mann's prior assertions that there was no Medieval Warm Period or Little Ice Age." Al Gore commented that Inhofe and other deniers "will seize on anything to say up is down and black is white."

Blog responses on the day of publication
A group-authored post on RealClimate, of which Mann is one of the contributors, said "the panel has found reason to support the key mainstream findings of past research, including points that we have highlighted previously." Similarly, Roger A. Pielke, Jr. said that the National Research Council publication constituted a "near-complete vindication for the work of Mann et al."; McIntyre's blog Climate Audit published a review of the report by Hans von Storch, Eduardo Zorita and Jesus Rouco, who said that it supported their view that the MBH methodology was questionable.

News coverage
On the day of publication, the Associated Press highlighted the panel's finding that "recent warmth is unprecedented for at least the last 400 years and potentially the last several millennia." In an article titled "Science Panel Backs Study on Warming Climate", Andrew Revkin of the New York Times wrote that "A controversial paper asserting that recent warming in the Northern Hemisphere was probably unrivaled for 1,000 years was endorsed today, with a few reservations, by a panel convened by the nation's pre-eminent scientific body."

Next day, the BBC News coverage on 23 June 2006 headed  "Backing for 'hockey stick' graph" said the report "largely vindicates the researchers' work, first published in 1998." The Boston Globe reported that the panel had concluded that the evidence presented in the hockey stick graph was "probably true".

The Wall Street Journal story, written by the same reporter whose announcement of the McIntyre and McKitrick 2005 paper had featured on its front page, had the muted headline "Panel Study Fails To Settle Debate On Past Climates" for a piece on an inside page, which said the panel found that the key conclusion of MBH99 "is 'plausible' but not proved."

Further discussion
On 28 June 2006 Nature reported the outcome as "Academy affirms hockey-stick graph. But it criticizes the way the controversial climate result was used." The article said that the NRC panel had "concluded that systematic uncertainties in climate records from before 1600 were not communicated as clearly as they could have been". In a letter to Nature on August 10, 2006, Bradley, Hughes and Mann pointed out that this had been a comment made by North at the press conference, and was not stated in the report. The original title of their 1999 paper (MBH99) was "Northern Hemisphere temperatures during the past millennium: inferences, uncertainties, and limitations",  and it had concluded that "more widespread high-resolution data are needed before more confident conclusions can be reached". They said that "the uncertainties were the point of the article", and that it was "hard to imagine how much more explicit" they could have been about the uncertainties surrounding their work. They suggested that "poor communication by others" had led to the "subsequent confusion".

At the Wegman Report hearings in July 2006, Gerald North testified that, "Dr. Wegman's criticisms of the statistical methodology in the papers by Mann et al. were consistent with our findings," referring to the NRC report that found that the methodology did not have an undue effect on the graphs. In his view, "None of the statistical criticisms that have been raised by various authors unduly influence the shape of the final reconstruction. This is attested to by the fact that reconstructions performed without using principal components yield similar results."

In a debate in the United States House of Representatives on 2 December 2009, Representative Jim Sensenbrenner said that the National Academies NRC report had discredited Mann's theory and shown the "hockey stick" graph to be incorrect. This was disputed by John Holdren, the president's science adviser, who said that although the panel had found minor issues with Mann's methods, they had confirmed his results. When the question was subsequent put to the NRC panel chairman Gerald North, he agreed with Holdren and said "The conclusions that we came to were essentially the same as the hockey stick," and the scientific conclusion that the world was warming was independent of Mann's research.

Notes

References in chronological sequence

1965
.
1978
.
1979
.
1989
.
1990
.
1991
.
.
1992
 in IPCC supplementary report, 1992.
1993
.
.
.
1994
.
.
1995
.
.
1996
.
 pdf.
.
1997
.
.
.
1998
.
. Corrigendum: .
.
.
.
.
.
.
.
.
.
.
.
1999
.
.
.
.
2000
.
.
.
.
2001

.

.
 (graph attribution corrected by ).
.

.
. 
2002
.
.
.
.
.
.
2003
.

.
.
.
.
 ("MM03").
.
.
.
. [See correction of 13 November.]
 linked from Comments on McIntyre and McKitrick Paper as archived on 9 December 2003.
. [Correction to Schulz op-ed of 28 October.]
.
.
.
.
2004
.
.
.
.
.

.
.
.
.
.
.
2005
.
.
. Reprinted from The American Prospect, 10 January 2005.
 1 February 2005 issue, online publication linked from Climate Audit on 27 January.
.
.
. Corrigendum: .
.
.
.
.
.
.

.
.
.
.
.
.
.
.
.
.
.
.
.

.
.
.
.
.
.
.
2006
.
.
.
.
.
.
, Figure 1.
.
.
 Real Audio or mp3 download.
. (North Report).
.
.
.
.
.
.
.
.
.
.
.
.
.
.
.
 (Wegman Report).
.
.
 (154 MB PDF).
.
, enclosure: e-mailed requests.
.
.
.
.
2007
.
.
.,
.
.
.
.
.
 Report pp. 21–25.
.
2008
. Retracted.
.
.

.
.
. Provides an overview of The Discovery of Global Warming website.
2009
.
.
.
.
.
.
.
.
.
.
.
.
.
.
.
.
.
.
2010
 .
 .
 .
.
.
.
 "ICCER".
.
.
.
.
.
2011
.
.
.
.
. Chapters are available as pdf files.

. Available as a pdf.
. Available as a pdf.
. Available as a pdf.
. (reply to comments by A. Moberg)
2012
.
.
.
.
2013
.
.
.
.

Hockey stick controversy